Anomoeosis is a genus of moths in the Carposinidae family.

Species
Anomoeosis barbara Diakonoff, 1954
Anomoeosis carphopasta Diakonoff, 1954
Anomoeosis conites Diakonoff, 1954
Anomoeosis phanerostigma Diakonoff, 1954

References

Natural History Museum Lepidoptera generic names catalog

Carposinidae
Moth genera